BPM (Beats per Minute), also known as 120 BPM (Beats per Minute), is a 2017 French drama film directed by Robin Campillo and starring Nahuel Pérez Biscayart, Arnaud Valois and Adèle Haenel. The film is about the AIDS activism of ACT UP Paris in 1990s France. Campillo and co-screenwriter Philippe Mangeot drew on their personal experiences with ACT UP in developing the story.

It had its world premiere at the 2017 Cannes Film Festival, followed by screenings at other festivals. At Cannes it won critical acclaim and four awards, including the Grand Prix. It went on to win six César Awards, including Best Film, and other honours.

Plot
In the early 1990s, a group of HIV/AIDS activists associated with the Paris chapter of ACT UP struggle to effect action to fight the AIDS epidemic. While the French government has declared its intent to support HIV/AIDS sufferers, ACT UP stages public protests against their sluggish pace, accusing the government of censoring and minimizing the fight against the virus. When the pharmaceutical company Melton Pharm announces its plans to reveal its HIV trial results at a prominent pharmaceutical conference the following year, ACT UP invades its offices with fake blood and demands it release its trial results immediately. While ACT UP makes some headway with its public protests, its members fiercely debate the group's strategy, with conflicting goals of showmanship and persuasion, with conflicting aesthetics of positivity and misery. ACT UP struggles to plan a more effective Gay Pride parade than in previous years, bemoaning the depressing, "zombie" atmosphere the AIDS epidemic had created.

The film shows a number of large meetings in a lecture theatre where the radical element demand more direct action and others aim to bring the scientists to meetings where they can get them to communicate results sooner. A deaf person points out they can do direct action AND pursue meetings with the labs. But soon some radicals have attacked Helene, the mother of a teenager who contracted HIV through blood transfusion. Helene had pushed for politicians to be tried and jailed for their mishandling of blood screening (which is how her son got HIV). To some this is against ACT-UP principles as prison is an unsafe place where people get HIV. The group always seem to be arguing.

The film gradually shifts from the political storyline of ACT UP's actions to the personal stories of ACT UP members. Foreshadowing later events in the movie, Jeremie, a youth who lives with HIV in the group sees his health deteriorate rapidly. Per his wishes, the group parades in the streets after his death, putting his name and face to the ranks of AIDS victims. Newcomer Nathan, a gay man who doesn't live with HIV, begins to fall in love with the passionate veteran Sean, who is HIV-positive. Nathan and Sean start a sexual relationship, and discuss their sexual histories. Sean got HIV when he was sixteen from his married maths teacher. Sean is already exhibiting signs of the disease's progression and soon his T-cell count is down to 160. Nathan offers to care for Sean as he gets worse. When Sean is released from hospital to Nathan's apartment for end-of-life care, Nathan euthanizes him. ACT UP holds a wake at their home. As per Sean's wishes, later they invade a health insurance conference, throwing his ashes over the conference-goers and their food.

Cast

Production
Director Robin Campillo co-wrote the screenplay, describing himself as "an ACT UP militant in the '90s", meaning he did not have to carry out any other investigation into how to accurately portray the experience. One scene was also based on his experience with the AIDS epidemic, as he said "I've dressed up a boyfriend on his death". Co-screenwriter Philippe Mangeot was also involved in ACT UP.

At Cannes, Campillo explained his decision to go ahead with directing the film, saying "BPM is above all a film I wanted to make where the force of words transforms into pure moments of action". The budget of $5 million was raised in months.

Release

The film had its world premiere at the 2017 Cannes Film Festival on 20 May 2017. On 24 June, it went to the Moscow International Film Festival, followed by the New Zealand International Film Festival in July. With the number of films at the Toronto International Film Festival being reduced from 2016, BPM (Beats per Minute) was nevertheless selected for the 2017 festival in September.

At Cannes, The Orchard acquired U.S. distribution rights to the film. It has been released in France on 23 August 2017 as scheduled.

Incidents 
On 4 February 2018, a group of Christian protesters holding icons and singing church chants disrupted the screening of BPM at the Romanian Peasant Museum in Bucharest. Displaying banners with nationalist and Christian messages, the protesters claimed that "a film with this plot is inadmissible to be screened" at the Romanian Peasant Museum, because "it is a film about homosexuals", and "the Romanian peasant is Orthodox Christian." After half an hour of dispute, the police took the protesters out of the cinema. The screening of BPM was part of a series of events dedicated to LGBT History Month. Director Tudor Giurgiu, a supporter of LGBT rights and witness to what happened, criticized in a Facebook post such demonstrations and asked for protection measures in cinema halls where LGBT-themed films are screened.

Reception

Critical reception
On the French review aggregator AlloCiné, the film has an average review score of 4.5 out of 5 based on 31 critics, making it the highest rated film of the year. It holds a 99% approval rating on review aggregator website Rotten Tomatoes, based on 135 reviews, with a weighted average of 8/10. The website's critical consensus reads, "Moving without resorting to melodrama, BPM offers an engrossing look at a pivotal period in history that lingers long after the closing credits roll." On Metacritic, the film has a score of 84 out of 100, based on 25 critics, indicating "universal acclaim".

Jada Yuan, writing for Vulture.com, spoke of being moved to tears by the film, praising it as "a unique, intimate portrait of the community from the inside". The Toronto Star'''s Peter Howell observed French critics at Cannes were generally excited about it and opined it deserved a top award. The Hollywood Reporter critic David Rooney positively reviewed the dialogue and the youthful cast, while criticizing the pace. Tim Robey, writing for The Daily Telegraph, gave it three of five stars, complimenting the comedic moments and a sex scene, balancing awareness of risk, with one character being HIV positive, and sexiness. Vanity Fair critic Richard Lawson hailed it as a "half sober and surveying docudrama, half wrenching personal illness narrative". Lawson and The Hollywood Reporter critics compared the film to the play The Normal Heart'' by Larry Kramer.

Accolades
It competed for the Palme d'Or in the main competition section at the 2017 Cannes Film Festival. In July 2017, it was listed among 10 films in competition for the Lux Prize. It was selected as the French entry for the Best Foreign Language Film at the 90th Academy Awards, but it was not nominated.

See also
 List of submissions to the 90th Academy Awards for Best Foreign Language Film
 List of French submissions for the Academy Award for Best Foreign Language Film

Notes

References

External links
 
 

2017 films
2017 drama films
2017 LGBT-related films
2010s French-language films
Films about activists
Films directed by Robin Campillo
Films set in the 1990s
Films set in Paris
French political drama films
French LGBT-related films
Best Film César Award winners
Gay-related films
HIV/AIDS in French films
LGBT-related political drama films
The Orchard (company) films
Queer Palm winners
Cannes Grand Prix winners
2010s French films